Tassaporn Wannakit (born 23 November 1989) is a Thai athlete specialising in the sprinting events. She won several medals on regional level, primarily in the 4 × 100 metres relay.

Competition record

Personal bests
Outdoor
100 metres – 11.64 (+0.1 m./s) (Andorf 2014)
200 metres – 24.41 (0.0 m./s) (Jakarta 2008)

References

1989 births
Living people
Tassaporn Wannakit
Tassaporn Wannakit
Athletes (track and field) at the 2010 Asian Games
Athletes (track and field) at the 2014 Asian Games
Universiade medalists in athletics (track and field)
Southeast Asian Games medalists in athletics
Tassaporn Wannakit
Tassaporn Wannakit
Tassaporn Wannakit
Competitors at the 2013 Southeast Asian Games
Competitors at the 2015 Southeast Asian Games
Universiade bronze medalists for Thailand
Competitors at the 2019 Southeast Asian Games
Medalists at the 2015 Summer Universiade
Tassaporn Wannakit